Opera North is an opera company based at The Grand Theatre, Leeds.  This article covers its establishment and early years.

History

On 10 March 1976, at a reception at Harewood House, a plan to make the Grand Theatre a northern home for English National Opera (ENO) was unveiled.  The Arts Council of Great Britain was prepared to back the scheme, provided that the local authorities in the area would also contribute funding.  With Leeds City Council in the lead, sufficient funds were forthcoming, although there was some slippage in the proposed timetable.  English National Opera North (ENON) was established in late 1977, with Lord Harewood as Managing Director and Graham Marchant as General Administrator.  Its first performance (of Saint-Saëns's Samson et Dalila) was given on 15 November 1978.  The opera was conducted by the founding Music Director of the company, David Lloyd-Jones.

In the inaugural 1978–79 season, 11 operas were performed.  Six were new productions, four of them directed by Patrick Libby, ENON's Director of Productions.  The remaining five productions comprised one from Scottish Opera (Colin Graham's Peter Grimes) and four from ENO. Before the end of the season, the company toured The Marriage of Figaro to Barnsley, Scarborough and Darlington.

the 1979–80 season saw two more Libby productions (one of them the rarely performed A Village Romeo and Juliet by Frederick Delius who was born in Bradford), six, including Richard Rodney Bennett's The Mines of Sulphur, borrowed from ENO, one revival from 1978 to 1979, Wendy Toye's new The Merry Widow and Steven Pimlott's spectacular new Nabucco.  Libby's Rigoletto was played in a tent in Sheffield as well as at the company's regular venues in Newcastle, Salford and Nottingham.

Most productions during this period were conducted by Lloyd-Jones.  Clive Timms, Opera North's Head of Music, and John Pryce-Jones, Chorus Master, also conducted, with Elgar Howarth, Gabriele Bellini and David Parry as guest conductors.  A stalwart of ENO, Robert Ferguson, sang many of the leading tenor roles, frequently with John Rawnsley and/or Stuart Harling (baritones) and John Tranter (bass).  Guest singers included Josephine Veasey, Ann Murray, Elizabeth Harwood, Della Jones, Elizabeth Vaughan, Joan Carden, Felicity Palmer, Graham Clark, David Hillman, Peter Glossop, Forbes Robinson, Derek Hammond-Stroud and Norman Bailey.  Another special guest, in the non-singing role of Frosch in Die Fledermaus, was Clive Dunn of Dad's Army fame.

As well as performing during this period at its regular venues, the company also visited Dortmund (with Peter Grimes), Glasgow (with Nabucco and Carmen) and Buxton.

At the end of the 1981–82 season, English National Opera North changed its name to Opera North and became an independent entity.

Repertoire
Below is a list of main stage operas performed by the company during the period when it was known as English National Opera North.

Sources

References

See also
Opera North: history and repertoire, seasons 1981–82 to 1989–90
Opera North: history and repertoire, seasons 1990–91 to 1996–97
Opera North: history and repertoire, seasons 1997–98 to 2003–04
Opera North: history and repertoire, seasons 2004–

Opera North
Opera-related lists